Velhartice is a municipality and village in Klatovy District in the Plzeň Region of the Czech Republic. It has about 800 inhabitants. The historic centre is well preserved and is protected by law as an urban monument zone.

Administrative parts
Villages of Braníčkov, Chotěšov, Drouhavec, Hory Matky Boží, Jarkovice, Konín, Nemilkov, Radvanice, Stojanovice and Tvrdoslav are administrative parts of Velhartice.

Geography
It lies in the Bohemian Forest Foothills. The Ostružná River flows through the municipality.

History

The first written mention of the Velhartice settlement is from 1318. However, the Gothic Velhartice Castle was built already in 1290–1310 by Bušek the Elder and Bušek the Younger, who later became known as Lords of Velhartice and became chamberlains of Emperor Charles IV.

In the 15th century, a significant owner of Velhartice was Zdeněk Lev of Rožmitál, who granted the estate the right to mine precious metals. The prosperity ended with the Thirty Years' War. After the war, Velhartice was acquired by Don Martin de Hoeff Huerto who had the castle rebuilt in the late Renaissance style. Huerto tried to forcefully re-catholicize the region, but he also abolished the corvée.

At the end of the 18th century, the then-owners of Velhartice, the Desfours family, founded a paper mill. The second paper mill was founded in 1865. A leather-tanning factory opened in 1882. The last owner of the Velhartice Castle, Prince Joseph Windisch-Graetz, was expelled to Austria in 1946.

Sights

The main landmark of Velhartice is the Velhartice Castle. Today it is owned by the state and opened to the public.

In Nemilkov is the Nemilkov Castle. It is a Renaissance-Baroque residence built on the remains of a medieval Gothic fortress from the 14th century. The fortress was rebuilt in the 16th century and extended in the late 18th century. During the 20th century, it was damaged by careless use. Today it is in private ownership and is gradually being repaired.

The Church of the Nativity of the Virgin Mary. It was originally a Romanesque church founded around 1240, rebuilt and extended in the Gothic style in 1325. Renaissance modifications were made after 1510, further baroque modifications date from the 18th and 19th centuries.

The Church of Saint Mary Magdalene is a cemetery church which is said to be one of the scariest places in the country, and is associated with several legends. It was built in 1373 and rebuilt in the 16th century.

Gallery

See also
Velhartice Ark

References

External links

Velhartice Castle

Villages in Klatovy District
Prácheňsko